Tangadagi is a village in the Muddebihal taluk of Bijapur district in Karnataka state, India.

Demographics
Per the 2011 Census of India, Tangadagi has a total population of 3162; of whom 1549 are male and 1613 female.

See also
Gulbarga
Jewargi
Kudalasangama
Muddebihal
Bagalkot

References

Villages in Bijapur district, Karnataka
History of Karnataka